Paw Paw High School, or PPHS, is a public four-year high school located at 511 Chapman in Paw Paw, Illinois, a village in Lee County, Illinois, in the Midwestern United States. PPHS serves the communities and surrounding areas of Paw Paw. The campus is located 20 miles south of Rochelle, Illinois, and serves a mixed village and rural residential community.

Academics
In 2009, 62% of Paw Paw High School students met or exceeded standards on the Prairie State Achievement Exam, an Illinois state test part of the No Child Left Behind Act. The average high school graduation rate in the period 1999-2009 was 89.1%.

Athletics
Paw Paw High School competes in the Little Ten Conference and is a member school in the Illinois High School Association. Their mascot is the Bulldogs, with school colors of purple and gold. The school has no state championships on record in team athletics and activities.

History
The history of education in Paw Paw dates back to 1836 with the construction of the first school house.

References

External links
 Paw Paw Community Unit School District 271

Public high schools in Illinois
Schools in Lee County, Illinois